is a Portuguese male name, derived either from Latin  'grandfather' or  'chamberlain, squire'. It is quite popular in the Portuguese-speaking countries and communities. There is also a female variant in both Portuguese and Spanish:  and  respectively.

The patronymic from Nuno is Portuguese  and Spanish .

It may refer to:

Football players
Nuno Afonso (born 1974), Portuguese football player (defender)
Nuno Assis (born 1977), Portuguese football player (midfielder) 
Nuno André Coelho (born 1986), Portuguese football player (defender)
Nuno Miguel Prata Coelho (born 1987), Portuguese football player (midfielder/defender)
Nuno Diogo (born 1981), Portuguese football player (defender)
Nuno Espírito Santo (born 1974), Portuguese football player (goalkeeper) and manager
Nuno Frechaut (born 1977), Portuguese football player (midfielder/defender)
Nuno Gomes (born 1976), Portuguese football player (forward)
Nuno Manta Santos (born 1978), Portuguese football player (midfielder) and manager
Nuno Piloto (born 1982), Portuguese football player (midfielder)
Nuno Filipe Martins Rodrigues (born 1979), Portuguese football player (defender)
Nuno Santos (disambiguation), several Portuguese football players\
Nuno Tavares (born 2000), Portuguese football player (defender)
Nuno Valente (born 1974), Portuguese football player (defender)

Portuguese nobility
Nuno Álvares Pereira (1360–1431), Constable of Portugal and general, later canonised
Nuno I Álvares Pereira de Melo (1638–1725), 1st Duke of Cadaval
Nuno II Álvares Pereira de Melo (1741–1771), 4th Duke of Cadaval
Nuno III Álvares Pereira de Melo (1799–1837), 6th Duke of Cadaval
Nuno IV Álvares Pereira de Melo (1888–1935), 9th Duke of Cadaval
Nuno Alvites (fl. 1017–1028), count of Portugal
Duarte Nuno, Duke of Braganza (1907–1976), claimant to the throne of Portugal
Nuno José Severo de Mendoça Rolim de Moura Barreto, 1st Duke of Loulé (1804–1875), three-time prime minister of Portugal

Other people
Nuno Bettencourt (born 1966), Portuguese-American musician
Nuno Canavarro (born 1962), Portuguese composer
Nuno da Cunha (1487–1539), Governor of Portuguese India
Nuno Gonçalves, 15th-century Portuguese court painter
Nuno Leal Maia (born 1947), Brazilian actor
Nuno Lopes (born 1978), Portuguese actor
Nuno Markl (born 1971), Portuguese comedian, writer, radio host, television host, voice actor and screenwriter
Nuno Mendes (disambiguation), several people
Nuno Pinheiro (born 1977), Portuguese graphic designer and illustrator
Nuno Pinheiro (born 1984), Portuguese volleyball player
Nuno Resende (born 1973), Portuguese singer
Nuno Ribeiro (born 1977), Portuguese road bicycle racer
Nuno Roque, Portuguese artist, actor, singer-songwriter and director
Nuno Tristão, 15th-century Portuguese explorer
Nuno Pereira (born 1979), entertainer, lead singer

See also

Nuño
Neno (name)
Niño (name)
Nino (name)

Portuguese masculine given names